Jayarama Reddiar was an Indian politician and former Member of the Legislative Assembly of Tamil Nadu. He was elected to the Tamil Nadu legislative assembly as an Indian National Congress candidate from Aruppukottai constituency in 1952 election.

K. Kamaraj became the Chief Minister of Tamil Nadu after defeating him in Sattur constituency in 1957 election.

References 

Living people
Indian National Congress politicians from Tamil Nadu
Year of birth missing (living people)
Madras MLAs 1952–1957